"Will You Love Me Tomorrow", sometimes known as "Will You Still Love Me Tomorrow", is a song with words by Gerry Goffin and music composed by Carole King. It was recorded in 1960 by the Shirelles at Bell Sound Studios in New York City, and hit number one on the Billboard Hot 100 chart. The song was the first by a black all-girl group to reach number one in the United States. It has since been recorded by many other artists including a 1971 version by co-writer Carole King.

The Shirelles' version

Background
In 1960, the American girl group the Shirelles released the first version of the song as Scepter single 1211, with "Boys" on the B-side. The single's first pressing was labeled simply "Tomorrow", then lengthened later. When first presented with the song, lead singer Shirley Owens (later known as Shirley Alston-Reeves) did not want to record it, because she thought it was "too country". She relented after a string arrangement was added. However, Owens recalled on Jim Parsons's syndicated oldies radio program, Shake Rattle Showtime, that some radio stations had banned the record because they had felt the lyrics were too sexually charged. The song is in AABA form.

Reception
In addition to reaching No. 1 in the United States, the song also reached No. 2 on the R&B chart and No. 4 in the UK. It reached No. 3 in New Zealand. This version of the song, with session musicians Paul Griffin on piano and Gary Chester on drums, as of 2009 was ranked as the 162nd greatest song of all time, as well as the best song of 1960, by Acclaimed Music. It was ranked at No. 126 among Rolling Stones list of The 500 Greatest Songs of All Time. Billboard named the song No. 3 on their list of 100 Greatest Girl Group Songs of All Time.

Chart history

Weekly charts

Year-end charts

Answer songs
The Satintones, an early Motown group, also recorded an answer song called "Tomorrow and Always," which used the same melody as the original but initially neglected to credit King and Goffin. Following a threat of litigation, later pressings of the record included proper credit. Eventually, it was withdrawn and replaced with a different song. The Satintones' versions are included in the box set The Complete Motown Singles, Volume 1: 1959–1961.

Carole King version

Background
In 1971, Carole King, who composed the music of the song, recorded a version of "Will You Love Me Tomorrow" for her second studio album Tapestry, with Joni Mitchell and James Taylor performing background vocals on separate audio channels. King's version of the song was taken at a considerably slower tempo. David Hepworth analyzed it as "less like the pleas for gentleness on the part of a trembling virgin and more like a mature woman requiring parity in a relationship." It gained considerable album-oriented rock airplay due to the large-scale commercial success of the album.

The song became a feature of King's live shows. Taylor recreated his part during their joint arena-based Troubadour Reunion Tour of 2010.

In the 2013 Broadway Beautiful: The Carole King Musical, the song is featured in part four times: once during its writing, once during King recording a demo of it, then with the Shirelles performing it, and then King singing and playing it later during an especially bad time in her marriage with Goffin. No other song is featured as frequently in the musical.

Personnel
Carole King – piano, vocals
Danny "Kootch" Kortchmar – acoustic guitar
Russ Kunkel – drums
Charles "Charlie" Larkey – bass guitar
Joni Mitchell – background vocals
James Taylor – acoustic guitar, backing vocals

Notable cover versions
The Four Seasons hit number 15 in Cash Box and number 24 on the Billboard Hot 100 with the song in 1968.
Linda Ronstadt released a version on her 1970 album, Silk Purse. It reached number 98 in Cash Box and (Bubbled Under to) number 111 in Billboard.
Roberta Flack's version hit number 76 on the Billboard Hot 100 in 1972 as "Will You Still Love Me Tomorrow".
Melanie Safka reached number 82 on the Billboard Hot 100 in 1973 and reached the top 40 in the United Kingdom in 1974.
Morningside Drive released a dance version of the song in 1975, which reached number 33 on the Billboard Hot 100.
Dana Valery recorded a dance version that hit number 95 on the Billboard Hot 100 in 1976.
Dave Mason had a number 39 hit on the Billboard Hot 100 in 1978 with his remake. It was his final top 40 hit on that chart.
Dionne Warwick recorded her version for her 1983 album, How Many Times Can We Say Goodbye, which featured the original Shirelles on guest vocals.
Leslie Grace released a bachata version in 2012 which became her debut single. Her version peaked at number one on the Billboard Tropical Songs chart and number one on the Latin Airplay chart, becoming the youngest female artist to do so. She also released a dance version for her self-titled album, Leslie Grace.
Taylor Swift performed the song at the 2021 Rock and Roll Hall of Fame Induction Ceremony.
Amy Winehouse released a version on her album Lioness: Hidden Treasures in 2011

See also
List of Hot 100 number-one singles of 1961 (U.S.)
List of Billboard number-one Latin songs of 2012

References

External links 
 

1960 songs
1961 singles
1968 singles
Carole King songs
The Shirelles songs
Linda Ronstadt songs
Amy Winehouse songs
Melanie (singer) songs
Smokey Robinson songs
Bee Gees songs
Joe Walsh songs
The Zombies songs
Dave Mason songs
Billboard Hot 100 number-one singles
Cashbox number-one singles
Songs with lyrics by Gerry Goffin
Songs written by Carole King
Bachata songs
Lobo (musician) songs
Scepter Records singles
1960 singles
2012 debut singles
Leslie Grace songs
Pop standards
Top Stop Music singles
Song recordings produced by Bill Szymczyk
Françoise Hardy songs
Obscenity controversies in music